Maghoki Attori Mosque is a historical mosque in Bukhara, Uzbekistan. It forms a part of the historical religious complex of Lyab-i Hauz. The mosque is located in the historical center of Bukhara, about 300 meters southwest of Po-i-Kalyan, 100 meters southwest of the Toqi Telpak Furushon trading dome and 100 meters east of Lab-i Hauz. It is a part of UNESCO World Heritage Site  Historic Centre of Bukhara. Today, the mosque is used as a carpet museum.

History
It is speculated as built in the 9th to 10th century on the remains of a Zoroastrian temple from the pre-Islamic era. Before the Arab conquest there was a bazaar on the site of Maghoki Attori Mosque. It was a market for idols, potions and spices – attor (perfumes) and other goods. Besides this, there was formerly a Temple of the Moon (Mah) close to this place. Before the construction of the first synagogue, Jews in Bukhara had shared a place in the mosque with Muslims. Some say that Bukharian Jews and Muslims worshipped alongside each other in the same place at the same time. Other sources insist that Jews worshipped after Muslims. The mosque is also notable for being one of the oldest surviving mosques in Central Asia and one of the few surviving buildings in Bukhara from the time before the Mongolian invasion. In the 12th century, when Kara-Khanids reigned in Bukhara, the mosque was substantially rebuilt and re-dressed. It also received a new main facade in the south. In the middle of the 15th century, it was restored and a new portal with iwan was built in the eastern ground. At the beginning of the 1930s the mosque was restored again.

Architecture
The building has a rectangular ground plan of 12 x 7.5 square meters. In the main axis of the building, the flat roof carries two octagonal tholobates with latticed arched windows. They also have octagonal domes. The floor of the mosque is about 4.50 meters below the earth's surface. This is the reason for the mosque being called 'maghākī' which is Persian for "in a ditch" or "in a pit". Another "pit" mosque is the Magok-i-Kurpa Mosque located about 150 meters northwest. Narshakhi, in his History of Bukhara (ca. 950), named the mosque built on the site of the former temple "maghāk", i.e. "pit", because even then half of it was concealed from view by the rising soil level. The southern façade is most richly equipped and was the former main entrance. Ornaments are made mainly by the arrangement of cut and carved bricks and by terracotta tiles with floral motifs. The pointed arch of the iwan is resting on two quarter columns set in walls, decorated with wattle. On each side of the iwan, three rectangular frames with decorative patterns are arranged one above the other.

See also
List of mosques in Uzbekistan

References

External link

9th-century mosques
Mosques in Bukhara